Stefan Koubek defeated Álex Calatrava 6–1, 4–6, 6–4 to win the 2000 Delray Beach International Tennis Championships.

Seeds

  Patrick Rafter (quarterfinals)
  Karim Alami (first round)
 n/a
  Mariano Zabaleta (first round)
  Chris Woodruff (quarterfinals)
  Stefan Koubek (champion)
  Michael Chang (first round)
  Francisco Clavet (second round)

Draw

Finals

Top half

Bottom half

External links
 Association of Tennis Professionals (ATP) – 2000 Delray Beach Men's Singles draw

Delray Beach International Tennis Championships
Delray Beach Open
2000 Citrix Tennis Championships